Beauchamp may refer to:

People

Surname 
 Alphonse de Beauchamp, French historian 
 Anne Beauchamp, 15th Countess of Warwick (d. 1449)
 Antony Beauchamp (1918–1957), British photographer
 Beauchamp, stage name sometimes used by French actor Edmond Beauchamp
 Bianca Beauchamp, Canadian fetish model
 Sir Brograve Beauchamp, Conservative Member of Parliament for Walthamstow East from 1931 to 1945
 Christine Beauchamp, American businesswoman
 Christine Beauchamp (pseudonym), case study patient
 D. D. Beauchamp (1908–1969), American screenwriter
 David J. Beauchamp (born 1940), American politician
 Sir Edward Beauchamp, Liberal Party Member of Parliament for Lowestoft from 1906 to 1922
 Lady Evelyn Beauchamp, one of the first people in modern times to enter the tomb of Tutenkhamun
 Fleurette Beauchamp-Huppé, Canadian pianist, soprano and teacher
 Frances Estill Beauchamp (1860-1923), American temperance activist, social reformer, lecturer
 Frank Beauchamp, owner of coalmines in the Somerset coalfield 
 George Beauchamp, American inventor of musical instruments and co-founder of Rickenbacker
 George Beauchamp (sailor), Titanic survivor
 Guy de Beauchamp, 10th Earl of Warwick (d. 1315)
 Henry Beauchamp, 1st Duke of Warwick (1425-1445)
 Jereboam O. Beauchamp, American lawyer and murderer
 Jim Beauchamp, American major league baseball player and major league baseball coach (1939-2007)
 Joan Beauchamp, prominent suffragette and co-founder of the Communist Party of Great Britain
 Joe Beauchamp (1944–2020), American football player
 John Beauchamp, 1st Baron Beauchamp of Warwick
 John Beauchamp, 1st Baron Beauchamp of Somerset
 John Beauchamp, 2nd Baron Beauchamp of Somerset
 John Beauchamp, 3rd Baron Beauchamp of Somerset
 John Beauchamp, 1st Baron Beauchamp (fifth creation)
 John Beauchamp (Plymouth Company), influential member of the Plymouth Company
 Josh Beauchamp, dancer, singer and member of international pop group Now United
 Kathleen Mansfield Beauchamp, the birth name of writer Katherine Mansfield
 Kay Beauchamp, leading member of Communist Party of Great Britain and co-founder of the Daily Worker, later the Morning Star newspaper
 Line Beauchamp, Canadian politician, Quebec provincial cabinet minister
 MarJon Beauchamp (born 2000), American basketball player
 Mary Elizabeth Beauchamp (1825–1903), British-American educator, author
 Michael Beauchamp, Australian international soccer player, defender
 Noah Beauchamp, American blacksmith and murderer 
 Paul Marais de Beauchamp (1883–1977), French zoologist
 Pierre Beauchamp (1631-1705), French baroque choreographer, dancer and composer
 Pierre-François Godard de Beauchamps (1689-1761), French playwright, theater historian and libertine novelist
 Reginald E. Beauchamp, American sculptor (1910-2000)
 Richard Beauchamp, 13th Earl of Warwick (1382-1439)
 Richard Beauchamp, 2nd Baron Beauchamp (1435–1502/3)
 Scott Thomas Beauchamp, American soldier, see Scott Thomas Beauchamp controversy
 Thomas Beauchamp, 11th Earl of Warwick (d. 1369)
 Thomas Beauchamp, 12th Earl of Warwick (c. 1339-1401) 
 Tom Beauchamp, American philosopher and bioethicist
 Walter de Beauchamp (disambiguation), multiple people
 William Martin Beauchamp (born 1830), American ethnologist and clergyman
 William de Beauchamp (of Elmley), (c1105–c1170), Anglo-Norman baron and sheriff
 William de Beauchamp (1185) (c.1185–1260), English judge and High Sheriff
 William (III) de Beauchamp, Anglo-Norman baron and sheriff
 William de Beauchamp, 9th Earl of Warwick (1237–1298), English nobleman and soldier
 William Beauchamp, 1st Baron Bergavenny (c.1343–1411), English peer

Families 
 Family name of the Earls and Duke of Warwick, first creation (1268-1492)
 Family name of several creations of Barons Beauchamp
 Family name of the Barons Bergavenny, second creation (1392-1447), and Earl of Worcester, third creation (1420-1422)
 Family name of Beauchamp, Baron St Amand 
 Family name of the Barons of Bedford, of the first creation
 Earl Beauchamp, a title held by the Lygon family
 Viscount Beauchamp, a subsidiary title of the Marquess of Hertford, second creation
 Viscount Beauchamp of Hache, a subsidiary title of the Duke of Somerset, first creation
 Beauchamp baronets

Given name 
 Beauchamp Bagenal, an Irish rake from Bagenalstown, County Carlow
 Beauchamp Seymour, 1st Baron Alcester, a British admiral
 Beauchamp Duff, a Scottish officer who served as Commander-in-Chief of India during World War I
 Beauchamp Tower, English inventor and railway engineer
 James Beauchamp Clark, or Champ Clark, a prominent American politician

Places

England 
 Acton Beauchamp, a village in Herefordshire
 Beauchamp Place, a shopping street in the Knightsbridge area of London
 Beauchamp Roding, a village in Essex
 Compton Beauchamp, a village in Oxfordshire
 Drayton Beauchamp, a village in Buckinghamshire
 Hatch Beauchamp, a village in Somerset 
 Kibworth Beauchamp, a village in Leicestershire
 Naunton Beauchamp, a village in Worcestershire
 Shelsley Beauchamp, a village in Worcestershire
 Shepton Beauchamp, a village in Somerset

France 
 Montigny–Beauchamp station, on the Paris Metro
 Beauchamp, Val-d'Oise, in the Val-d'Oise département

Other uses 
 Beauchamp College, a further education community college in Oadby, United Kingdom
 Beauchamp House, listed on the National Register of Historic Places in Westover, Maryland, USA

See also 
 Beacham
 Beauchamps (disambiguation)
 Beauchamp–Sharp Tragedy, the murder of Kentucky legislator Solomon P. Sharp by Jereboam O. Beauchamp
 Beauchamp-Feuillet notation, a system of dance notation
 Beecham

French-language surnames